Trichostatin A (TSA) is an organic compound that serves as an antifungal antibiotic and selectively inhibits the class I and II mammalian histone deacetylase (HDAC) families of enzymes, but not class III HDACs (i.e., sirtuins). However, there are recent reports of the interactions of this molecule with Sirt 6 protein. TSA inhibits the eukaryotic cell cycle during the beginning of the growth stage. TSA can be used to alter gene expression by interfering with the removal of acetyl groups from histones (histone deacetylases, HDAC) and therefore altering the ability of DNA transcription factors to access the DNA molecules inside chromatin. It is a member of a larger class of histone deacetylase inhibitors (HDIs or HDACIs) that have a broad spectrum of epigenetic activities.  Thus, TSA has some potential as an anti-cancer drug.  One suggested mechanism is that TSA promotes the expression of apoptosis-related genes, leading to cancerous cells surviving at lower rates, thus slowing the progression of cancer.  Other mechanisms may include the activity of HDIs to induce cell differentiation, thus acting to "mature" some of the de-differentiated cells found in tumors. HDIs have multiple effects on non-histone effector molecules, so the anti-cancer mechanisms are truly not understood at this time.

TSA inhibits HDACs 1, 3, 4, 6 and 10 with IC50 values around 20 nM.

TSA represses IL (interleukin)-1β/LPS (lipopolysaccharide)/IFNγ (interferon γ)-induced nitric oxide synthase 2 (NOS2) expression in murine macrophage-like cells but increases LPS-stimulated NOS2 expression in murine N9 and primary rat microglial cells.

Vorinostat is structurally related to trichostatin A and used to treat cutaneous T cell lymphoma.

See also
 Histone deacetylase inhibitor
 Vorinostat (SAHA)

References

Further reading

External links
  Trichostatin_A Safety data sheet by Fermentek

Anilines
Antibiotics
Antifungals
Aromatic ketones
Histone deacetylase inhibitors
Hydroxamic acids